Jolin may refer to:

People
 Jolin Chien (born 1986), Taiwanese singer and actor
 Jolin Tsai (born 1980), Taiwanese singer-songwriter and actress
 Dominique Jolin (born 1964), French Canadian creator of the children's show Toopy and Binoo
 Einar Jolin (1890–1976), Swedish painter
 Ellen Jolin (1854–1939), Swedish writer and artist
 Johnny Jolin (born 1964), American country music artist
 Michele Jolin, American social entrepreneur and policymaker
 Simon Jolin-Barrette, Canadian lawyer and politician

Other uses
 Jolin, Iran, also romanized as Jolleyn, a village in Razavi Khorasan Province

See also
 Jolina, a 1999 album by Jolina Magdangal